Gregory Tyrone Taylor (born 14 December 1987) is a Bahamas cricketer and the captain of the Bahamas national cricket team. Taylor is a left-handed batsman who also bowls as a left-arm bowler. Taylor also played as an occasional wicketkeeper.

Biography
Taylor made his debut for the Bahamas in the 2004 Americas Affiliates Championship against the Turks and Caicos Islands.	

Taylor made his Twenty20 debut for the Bahamas in the 1st round of the 2008 Stanford 20/20 against Jamaica, where he scored 10 runs and stumped Xavier Marshall off the bowling of Narendra Ekanayake.

Taylor represented the Bahamas in the 2008 ICC World Cricket League Division Five and in the 2010 ICC Americas Championship Division 2. He captained the sidein the 2010 ICC World Cricket League Division Eight, gaining the man-of-the-match award in their win over Gibraltar. Taylor represented the Bahamas in the 2010 ICC Americas Championship Division 1.

In July 2019, he was named in the Bahamian squad for their tour of Bermuda.

In October 2021, Taylor was named as the captain of the Bahamas Twenty20 International (T20I) squad for the 2021 ICC Men's T20 World Cup Americas Qualifier tournament in Antigua. He made his T20I debut on 7 November 2021, for the Bahamas against Canada.

References

External links

1987 births
Living people
Bahamian cricketers
Bahamas cricket captains
Bahamas Twenty20 International cricketers
Wicket-keepers